Horace B. Chase (December 25, 1810September 1, 1886) was an American Democratic politician and Milwaukee County pioneer.  He was the 14th mayor of Milwaukee, Wisconsin, (1862) and represented southern Milwaukee County in the Wisconsin State Assembly during the 1st Wisconsin Legislature (1848).

Biography

Chase was born in Vermont, on Christmas Day of 1810 and lived near Derby, Vermont. One of Milwaukee's pioneers, he first arrived in Milwaukee in December 1834, left for Chicago, and returned to settle in Milwaukee in March 1835. Later in that year, Chase was the clerk of the first election in ever held in Milwaukee. He was an alderman, county supervisor, served in the first Wisconsin Constitutional Convention of 1846, and served as mayor of Milwaukee in 1862. He also served in the first Wisconsin State Assembly in 1848.  

Chase died on September 1, 1886, at his home in Milwaukee, after an illness of several months.  His body was interred at Milwaukee's historic Forest Home Cemetery.  Near the time of his death, he was referred to as the oldest remaining settler of Milwaukee.

References

External links
 "Tales of Fifty Years Ago". (Sept. 19, 1885). Milwaukee Journal.
 

|-

Members of the Wisconsin State Assembly
County supervisors in Wisconsin
Milwaukee Common Council members
Mayors of Milwaukee
1810 births
1886 deaths
People from Orleans County, Vermont
19th-century American politicians